Kathy Long (born April 21, 1964) is an American kickboxer, mixed martial artist, and actress. She has held various kickboxing championships, including two KICK World Kickboxing titles and the WKA and ISKA world titles.

Early life
Long was born in St. Louis, Missouri, and was raised in Sunny Mead, California. Later, she moved to Bakersfield where she trained in martial arts under Eric Nolan, who was her manager and trainer throughout her kickboxing career.

Career
Long is a practitioner of the martial arts. She began her training in the Japanese art of Aikido, eventually earning a black belt in the system. Long would go on to earn a black belt in Chinese Kung Fu San Soo, eventually reaching the level of master in the style. She would train in Brazilian Jiu-Jitsu with the Machado family, as well as in Jeet Kune Do, Tae Kwon Do, Kali, and Wing Chun Kung Fu.

Long has appeared in numerous movies, and was Michelle Pfeiffer's stunt double in Batman Returns.

In the 1990s, Long was inducted into several sports halls of fame. These would include the Bob Elias' Sports Hall of Fame, Inside Kung Fu Hall of Fame ("Female of the Year"), and the Black Belt Magazine Black Belt Hall of Fame (1991 "Women of the Year"). She has appeared on the cover of 35 magazines. Between 1994 and 1998, Long authored a monthly column in Black Belt Magazine.

Long became a professional kickboxer, and one of the top female fighters in the sport's history. She compiled an 18–1 record, winning five world titles in the process, and earning several nicknames including the "Queen of Mean", "Princess of Pain", and "The Punisher".

Some of her ring career highlights include wins over Ramona Gatto, Bonnie Canino, Japanese star Kyoko "Kamikaze" Miyazaki, French champion Dani Rocard, Canadian champion Nora Daigle and two wins over Denise Taylor. Her only loss as a professional kickboxer came in a Muay Thai match with Britain's Lisa Howarth at Pickett's Lock near London in February 1990.

Kathy had a brief three-fight career in professional boxing between March and June 1998. She took two four-round decisions over Sandra Yard and lost a four-round decision to Lena Akesson retiring from boxing with a career record of two wins and one defeat - all four-rounders, all by decisions.

Long provided commentary at the first Ultimate Fighting Championship event. On August 15, 2009, almost 16 years after she provided commentary for the very first Ultimate Fighting Championship, Long made her MMA debut defeating fighter Avery Vilche by decision at "Call to Arms" promotions Called Out event in Ontario, California.

In preparation for her debut Long trained with Betiss Mansouri and Romie Aram at Millennia MMA, Gokor Chivichyan and Gene LeBell at the Hayastan Academy, Ahmad Reese and Lisa Twight of Gym Jones, Javier Vazquez at Universal Martial Arts Center, and with Muay Thai and strength conditioning coach Maria Morales.

On August 22, 2015, after a six-year hiatus from MMA, Long returned to MMA competition at age 51. She fought under the Ascension Muay Thai and Kickboxing promotion in Tijuana, Mexico against Mexican fighter Mixia Medina and won the fight by decision. She is now (2-0).

Long currently teaches at Tapout in Los Angeles.

Personal life
Long currently lives in Los Angeles.

Titles and honors

Hall of Fames 
 Black Belt Hall of Fame (1991 Woman of the Year)
 Black Belt Hall of Fame (1992 Full Contact Fighter of the Year)
 Inside Kung Fu Hall of Fame (1992 Female of the Year)
 Bob Ellas Kern County Sports Hall of Fame (1996)

Titles 
 2x KICK World Kickboxing Champion
 1x WKA World Kickboxing Champion
 1x ISKA World Kickboxing Champion
 1x WMAC World Kickboxing Champion

Kickboxing record

|-  style="background:#cfc;"
| 1992-04-00 || Win ||align=left| Nora Daigle || ||  || Decision (Unanimous) || 8 || 2:00 || 
|-
|-  style="background:#cfc;"
| 1992-03-16 || Win ||align=left| Kyoko Miyasaki ||  || Las Vegas, Nevada, USA || Decision (unanimous) || 5 || 3:00 || 
|-
! style=background:white colspan=9 |
|-  style="background:#cfc;"
| 1991-00-00 || Win ||align=left| Ramona Gatto||  || USA || Points ||  || || 
|-
|-  style="background:#cfc;"
| 1990-08-06 || Win ||align=left| Denise Taylor||  || Lake Tahoe, Nevada, USA || Decision (Unanimous) || 12 || 2:00 || 13-1
|-
! style=background:white colspan=9 |
|-  style="background:#fbb;"
| 1990-02-03 || Loss ||align=left| Lisa Howarth|| Muay Thai event || London, England || Points || 3 || 3:00 || 12-1
|-
|-  style="background:#cfc;"
| 1990-00-00 || Win ||align=left| Bonnie Canino ||  || France || Points || 12 || 2:00 || 
|- 
! style=background:white colspan=9 |
|-  style="background:#cfc;"
| 1989-00-00 || Win ||align=left| Danielle Roccard||  ||  || Points  || 9 || 2:00 || 
|- 
|-  style="background:#cfc;"
| 1989-00-00 || Win ||align=left| Denise Taylor||  || USA || Decision (Unanimous)  || 6 || 2:00 || 
|- 
|-  style="background:#cfc;"
| 1989-00-00 || Win ||align=left| Pixie Elmore||  || USA || Decision (Split)  || 7 || 2:00 || 9-0
|- 
! style=background:white colspan=9 |
|-
| colspan=9 | Legend:

Mixed martial arts record 

|-
|Win
|align=center|2–0
| Mixia Medina
|Decision (unanimous)
|Ascension Muay Thai and Kickboxing
|
|align=center|3
|align=center|3:00
|Tijuana, Baja California, Mexico
|
|-
|Win
|align=center|1–0
| Avery Vilche
|Decision (unanimous)
|Called Out MMA 1
|
|align=center|3
|align=center|3:00
|Ontario, California, United States
|

Professional boxing record

Filmography

Films 
 2012 Santa's Summer House as Sadie 
 2012 Art of Submission as Herself 
 2011 River of Darkness as Amy Williams 
 2009 End Game as News Reporter 
 1997 Romy and Michele's High School Reunion as Kick Boxing Instructor
 1995 Under the Gun as Lisa Krause
 1995 The Stranger as "The Stranger"
 1994 Natural Born Killers as Female deputy kicking Mickey (uncredited) 
 1993 Knights as Nea
 1992 Rage and Honor as Fros-T

Television

Miscellaneous crews

References

External links

 Kathy Long at YouTube

1964 births
American film actresses
American female kickboxers
American women boxers
American Jeet Kune Do practitioners
American Wing Chun practitioners
American aikidoka
American sanshou practitioners
American practitioners of Brazilian jiu-jitsu
Female Brazilian jiu-jitsu practitioners
American female mixed martial artists
Kickboxers from California
Kickboxers from Missouri
Living people
Mixed martial artists from California
Mixed martial arts broadcasters
Mixed martial artists utilizing Kung Fu San Soo
Mixed martial artists utilizing Wing Chun
Mixed martial artists utilizing Jeet Kune Do
Mixed martial artists utilizing kickboxing
Mixed martial artists utilizing boxing
Mixed martial artists utilizing aikido
Mixed martial artists utilizing Brazilian jiu-jitsu
Sportspeople from Bakersfield, California
People from Kern County, California
Sportspeople from Los Angeles